Swara is a quarterly, full-color magazine published by the East African Wild Life Society (EAWLS), a non-profit organization formed in 1961 following the amalgamation of the Wildlife Societies of Kenya and Tanzania, which were both founded in 1956.

Overview
The magazine was started with the name EAWLS Review. Later the name was changed to Africana and in 1978 the magazine was renamed as Sawara. Its headquarters is in Nairobi.

It is the Society's policy to conserve wildlife and its habitat in all its forms as a regional and international resource. The views expressed in the magazine do not always reflect those of EAWLS. The magazine is a forum and as such this is expected.

SWARA welcomes articles and photographs submitted by its readers.

References

Quarterly magazines
Wildlife magazines
Magazines published in Kenya
Mass media in Nairobi
English-language magazines
Magazines with year of establishment missing